Carl Hopkinson (born 14 September 1981) is a former English cricketer and current coach. He was a right-handed batsman and a right-arm medium pace bowler. He was also an extremely talented fielder.

Born in Sussex, he attended Brighton College and played for Lewes Priory Cricket Club.  Playing for Sussex since the beginning of his career, he was given their young player of the year award in 2000, and the following year he made his one-day debut.

He played in his first National League match against Scotland in 2003, bowling a spell of 3/19 and scoring 67 with the bat.

In 2005 he factored more often into the Sussex team, and top scored with 64. In 2006 he helped Sussex win the double, and then in 2007 he played a part in Sussex's County Championship win.

He currently  works as the fielding coach with the England first team squads. Previously with England   Lions and England Under-19s, and before that as a coach with  Sussex.

References

External links
Carl Hopkinson at ECB

1981 births
Living people
Sportspeople from Brighton
English cricketers
Sussex cricketers
People educated at Brighton College
English cricket coaches
Sussex Cricket Board cricketers